John Jaszcz (pronounced "Yosh") is an American music engineer, producer, and mixer.

"Yosh," as he has been nicknamed, currently resides and works in Franklin, Tennessee.  He is a well-known engineer in the R&B and Gospel music communities.  He has mixed albums for Kirk Franklin (Grammy Award winning 2005 release Hero among others), Dorinda Clark Cole, Tye Tribbett, Israel Houghton, Kurt Carr, Hezekiah Walker and Ledisi.

John Jaszcz got his start in Detroit as an engineer for records by Parliament-Funkadelic, Bootsy Collins, George Clinton, Zapp, and Commissioned.  His move to Tennessee facilitated his involvement in country and rock music working with artists including Billy Ray Cyrus, John Michael Montgomery, and Collective Soul.

His production credits include Sonicflood (produced with John Lawry), co-production with guitarist Dennis Coffey, and is involved in co-producing and mixing various projects with the Nashville-based production company Zodlounge.

In 2010, Jaszcz started an independent record label, Yosh Bros Entertainment, as a platform for artists he produces.  The roster currently includes Kree Woods, DJ Sahnik, and Lacey Mason.

He has won 7 Grammy Awards and multiple Dove Awards.

Partial discography
Kirk Franklin's album Fight of My Life, Hero, Rebirth, and Hello Fear 
Marvin Sapp's album Here I Am
Andraé Crouch's album The Journey
Donna Summer's album Crayons
CeCe Winans' album Thy Kingdom Come
Tye Tribbett's album Stand Out, and Fresh 
Dorinda Clark Cole's album Take It Back
Israel and New Breed's album Friend of God
Ledisi's album Lost and Found
Roberta Flack's album Roberta
The Shy's album All That MattersKree Woods' albums Kree Woods and Chance HappeningHezekiah Walker's albums Live In Toronto, Live In Atlanta, and Live In New York 
Code of Ethics's album Code of Ethics and Arms Around the World''

Full Discography available at AllMusic

References

External links
 Official website
 [ AllMusic entry]

1954 births
Living people
Record producers from Michigan
Mixing engineers